Radio Bío-Bío is a Chilean radio station with broad coverage in Chile. It covers news, sports, music, economics, and international relations.

The station was founded in 1966 in Concepción. In the 1990s it began to expand across the country. The first additional stations were in southern Chile in Temuco, Osorno and Puerto Montt, and Santiago in 1997. One of the main stations is operated in Lonquimay in the Cordillera of the Andes in the Araucanía Region. This station, Bío Bío Lonquimay, was established in 1995 in an isolated area and provides radio service for a mainly indigenous community.

Today, Radio Bio-Bio operates on 40 frequencies around the country, with 8 autonomous stations nationwide. It is the only completely independent station, not affiliated with any political, religious, or economic groups.

In July 2020 Eugenio González sued Radio Bío Bío commentator Tomás Mosciatti for libel. González demands over one million US dollars in compensation, more than enough to bring Radio Bío-Bío to bankruptcy.

References

External links
https://www.biobiochile.cl/

Radio stations in Chile
Mass media in Concepción, Chile
Mass media in Valparaíso
Mass media in Santiago
Radio stations established in 1966
1966 establishments in Chile
Society of Chile